Roxen is a medium-sized lake in south-central Sweden, east of Lake Vättern, part of the waterpath Motala ström and the Göta Canal. South of Lake Roxen is the city Linköping.

Roxen, especially the western parts, is very good for birdwatching. There are natural reserves at Kungsbro and Svartåmynningen.

The lake develops in a graben depression.

References

Lakes of Östergötland County
Motala ström basin
Rifts and grabens
Ramsar sites in Sweden